The Touques is a small  coastal river in Pays d'Auge in Normandy, France. The Touques is officially navigable up to the Pont des Belges,  from its estuary. Its source is in the Perche hills, south of Gacé. The river runs northwards, and flows into the English Channel between the communes of Deauville and Trouville-sur-Mer in North-Western Calvados. Two ports, the Port of Trouville-sur-Mer and Port of Deauville are situated on the river mouth opposite each other.

The Touques was diverted and straightened at the end of the 19th century and the neighbouring swamps dried and built on. Trouville-Deauville station was built on the river's former bed.

Trouville's harbour dock wall was rebuilt at the end of the 1990s due to erosion of the dock's stone wall.

The Touques flows through the following départements and towns:

Orne: Gacé
Calvados: Lisieux, Pont-l'Évêque, Touques, Trouville-sur-Mer, Deauville

References

Rivers of Normandy
Rivers of France
Rivers of Calvados (department)
Rivers of Orne
0Touques